Elections to Banbridge District Council were held on 15 May 1985 on the same day as the other Northern Irish local government elections. The election used three district electoral areas to elect a total of 15 councillors.

Election results

Note: "Votes" are the first preference votes.

Districts summary

|- class="unsortable" align="centre"
!rowspan=2 align="left"|Ward
! % 
!Cllrs
! % 
!Cllrs
! %
!Cllrs
! %
!Cllrs
!rowspan=2|TotalCllrs
|- class="unsortable" align="center"
!colspan=2 bgcolor="" | UUP
!colspan=2 bgcolor="" | DUP
!colspan=2 bgcolor="" | SDLP
!colspan=2 bgcolor="white"| Others
|-
|align="left"|Banbridge Town
|bgcolor="40BFF5"|44.2
|bgcolor="40BFF5"|3
|25.5
|1
|18.6
|1
|11.7
|0
|5
|-
|align="left"|Dromore
|bgcolor="40BFF5"|49.5
|bgcolor="40BFF5"|3
|31.5
|1
|19.0
|1
|0.0
|0
|5
|-
|align="left"|Knockiveagh
|bgcolor="40BFF5"|48.0
|bgcolor="40BFF5"|2
|19.1
|1
|18.6
|1
|14.3
|1
|5
|- class="unsortable" class="sortbottom" style="background:#C9C9C9"
|align="left"| Total
|47.2
|8
|25.4
|3
|18.7
|3
|8.7
|1
|15
|-
|}

District results

Banbridge Town

1985: 3 x UUP, 1 x SDLP, 1 x DUP

Dromore

1985: 3 x UUP, 1 x DUP, 1 x SDLP

Knockiveagh

1985: 2 x UUP, 1 x DUP, 1 x SDLP, 1 x Independent Nationalist

References

Banbridge District Council elections
Banbridge